The Scottish Fiscal Commission is a non-ministerial office. It was established by the Scottish Parliament to provide independent forecasts of taxes and social security expenditure, and GDP forecasts, to help inform the government's budget and its scrutiny by parliament.

It was formally created in June 2014, but moved to become a statutory body following the Scottish Fiscal Commission Act 2016. The commission is currently headed by Professor Graeme Roy.

Remit
The Scottish Fiscal Commission was established as a non-ministerial office on April 1, 2017, and is structurally and operationally independent of the Scottish Government. Its Commissioners are directly accountable to the Scottish Parliament. It publishes two sets of five-year forecasts a year in line with the Scottish budget process. It also publishes evaluations of its forecasts and working papers on related subjects. Its five-year forecasts cover Scotland's:

 Income Tax
 Land and Buildings Transaction Tax
 Non-Domestic Rates
 Scottish Landfill Tax
 Revenue from assigned VAT
Devolved social security expenditure
Onshore Gross Domestic Product

It also assesses the reasonableness of Scottish Ministers' borrowing projections

Members
The Scottish Fiscal Commission currently comprises three members, who are nominated for appointment by the Cabinet Secretary for Finance, Constitution and Economy. The nominations are considered by the Finance Committee of the Scottish Parliament, which then reports on the nominations to the Parliament as a whole. Parliament then decides whether or not to approve the nominations. The current members of the Scottish Fiscal Commission are:

 Professor Graeme Roy
Professor Frances Breedon
Professor David Ulph
Dr Domenico Lombardi

See also
 Taxation in Scotland

References

External links
 
Scottish Fiscal Commission - What We Do  This article contains quotations from this source, which is available under the  Open Government Licence v2.0. © Crown copyright.

Economy of Scotland
Non-ministerial departments of the Scottish Government
2014 establishments in Scotland
Taxation in Scotland
Government agencies established in 2014
Economic forecasting
Statistical forecasting
Forecasting organizations